Abebaw Tadesse is an Ethiopian general of the Ethiopian National Defense Force. He is currently the Deputy Chief of General Staff of Ethiopia, the second most senior position in the Ethiopian Armed Force, since 12 November 2020.

General Abebaw Tadesse served in various levels of commands and leading the Central Command, which was disbanded and relocated to Southern Command. He carried out a major military operation during the Eritrean–Ethiopian War in the Badme front. He was known for being the only non–Tigrayan general in the Ethiopian army during the rule of Meles Zenawi as he was from the Agaw ethnic group.

Abebaw retired from the army in 2018 but was later recalled during the Tigray war and was appointed the deputy Chief of General Staff. In January 2022 Abebaw said in an interview that the Ethiopian army was planning to reenter Tigray region of Ethiopia control by rebels.

References

Living people
Year of birth missing (living people)
Ethiopian generals
Tigray War